This is a list of films produced by the Tollywood (Telugu language film industry) based in Hyderabad in the year 1981.

1981

Dubbed films

References 

1981
Telugu
Telugu films